Wilhelm Schmidt-Ruthenbeck (1906–1988) was a German entrepreneur, the co-founder of the retail chain Metro AG.

Life 
His father was Karl Schmidt, who founded in 1923 in Duisburg, the company Karl Schmidt OGH. In 1963, Schmidt-Ruthenbeck founded, together with his brother Ernst Schmidt, the German company Metro AG.

Schmidt-Ruthenbeck was married with Vera Ruthenbeck. His children were Michael Schmidt-Ruthenbeck, Rainer Schmidt-Ruthenbeck, and Viola Schmidt-Ruthenbeck.

External links 
 Metro Group
 Manager-Magazin:Familienkrach und Aktienverkauf (German)

German company founders
20th-century German businesspeople
German businesspeople in retailing
Metro Group people
1906 births
1988 deaths